(This article is a summary translation of Spanish article Embalse de Arrocampo of Wikipedia (es))

The Arrocampo Reservoir, (embalse de Arrocampo or embalse de Arrocampo-Almaraz in Spanish), is located in the province of Cáceres, Extremadura, Spain.

It was created at 1976 to refrigerate the turbines of the Almaraz Nuclear Power Plant.
The nearest municipalities are Almaraz, Romangordo, Saucedilla and Serrejón.
The dam is on the Arrocampo River (arroyo Arrocampo), very close to where this little river joins the Tagus.

The Arrocampo reservoir as system to refrigerate the Almaraz Nuclear Plant 

The refrigeration of the Almaraz nuclear power plant was the first reason for the construction of the reservoir.
The water is taken from the Tagus and cover a U-shaped circuit of 25 km which allows the cooling of the heat generated by the two nuclear reactors of the plant. (See the illustration of the water circulation in Arrocampo) (...)
The walls of thermic separation (pantallas de separación térmica in Spanish) (PST) are 11 km long and 8 m high (...).  The tops of these walls are used by great cormorants and great egret as standing, resting and sleeping areas.

The Arrocampo reservoir as a wetland 

Biomass (ecology): biomass of reservoir waters is very important on all trophic levels, including Phytoplankton and zooplankton.
Fish: Angling is often practiced on weekend and feast days. There are sometimes a lot of recreational fishermen at the principal access to the reservoir, near the local route Almaraz-Saucedilla. Species available include: Carps, Common barbel, Tench (Tinca tinca), Gambusia, Largemouth bass or black bass (this species is very common and the size is often spectacular), European eel.
Birds: Before the creation of Arrocampo reservoir (1976), there were a lot of wild birds in lands of Almaraz, Saucedilla. White storks, cattle egrets, lesser kestrels ... are traditional birds of this area. Now there are two special protection areas: one is the parish church of Saucedilla (17 pairs of lesser kestrels on its walls and roofs) and the other one is all the Arrocampo reservoir.

Gallery

The Arrocampo reservoir as a Special Protection Area (SPA) for wild birds 

 

 White stork: nest & reproduction (n & r)
 Cattle egret:
 Great cormorant
 Lesser kestrel: (n & r)
 Purple heron: (n & r)
 Squacco heron: (n & r)
 Little grebe: (r & r)

 Great crested grebe: (n & r)
 Great bittern: (rare)
 Little bittern: (n & r)
 Night heron: (n & r)
 Little egret: (n & r)
 Great white egret
 Grey heron: (n & r)
 Eurasian spoonbill: (n & r)

 Greylag goose
 Egyptian goose: rare
 Ruddy shelduck: rare
 Eurasian wigeon
 Gadwall: (n & r)
 Common teal
 Mallard: (n & r)
 Northern shoveler

 Common pochard
 Tufted duck
 Black-winged kite: (n & r)
 Black kite
 Red kite
 Marsh harrier
 Hen harrier
 Montagus harrier
 Common buzzard
 Booted eagle
 Water rail
 Spotted crake
 Little crake
 Purple swamphen
 Northern lapwing
 Sanderling
 Dunlin
 Ruff
 Common snipe
 Black-tailed godwit
 Eurasian curlew
 Common redshank
 Moorhen
 Avocet
 Greenshank
 Wood sandpiper
 Common sandpiper
 Black-headed gull
 Lesser black-backed gull
 Gull-billed tern
 Whiskered tern
 Common kingfisher: (n & r)
 European bee-eater: (n & r)
 Sand martin: (n & r)
 Red-rumped swallow: (n & r)
 Yellow wagtail
 Grey wagtail

 Pied wagtail
 Bluethroat
 Cetti's warbler: (n & r)
 Zitting cisticola: (n & r)
 Savi's warbler: (n & r)
 Moustached warbler
 Sedge warbler
 Reed warbler
 Great reed warbler
 Bearded tit: rare
 Spanish sparrow: (n & r)
 Avadavat: (n & r)
 Collared pratincole
 Little ringed plover
 European golden plover

The Arrocampo ornithologic park (Saucedilla) 

The Arrocampo ornithologic park is located in the municipality of Saucedilla, near the reservoir. It was designed by the ornithologist Javier Briz.

 Monfragüe National Park: the proximity of this national park (...)
 Route 1: Arrocampo: (...)
 Route 2: Cerro Alto: (...)

References

Bibliography 
 El embalse de Arrocampo, 1996, Ed. Central Nuclear Almaraz.
 Almaraz, un entorno para admirar, by Javier Briz and Óscar J. González; Madrid 2011; Ed. Centrales Nucleares Almaraz-Trillo. Photographs book with extraordinary birds pictures of Óscar J. González, photographer and biologist. This book is not sold in bookshops but it is possible to get it at Centrales Nucleares de Almaraz-Trillo, in: comunicacion@cnat.es

External links 
 Site of Almaraz Nuclear Plant (in Spanish)
 Dam of Arrocampo reservoir (Spanish Association of Dams and Reservoirs) (in Spanish)
 Extremadura Government Special Protection Area for birds Arrocampo Reservoir (in Spanish)
 Website of Javier Briz (ornithologist) (SEO-Cáceres & SEO/BirdLife) with an exhaustive list of Arrocampo wild birds (in Spanish)
 Website of ASEDI (Spanish Association of Digiscoping) (in Spanish)

Special Protection Areas of Extremadura
Reservoirs in Extremadura